Max Spring (born 15 March 2001) is a French rugby union player. He currently plays as a fullback for Racing 92 in the Top 14.

His father is a former New Zealand player who settled down in France and his mother is from French Basque Country.

Career
On 19 June 2022, Max Spring scored a late try with the Barbarians against England at Twickenham, during the 2022 mid-year rugby union tests. 

He was called by Fabien Galthié to the French national team for the first time in June 2022, for the summer tour of Japan.

References

External links
 Racing 92
 EPCR
 All.Rugby
 It's Rugby

French rugby union players
Rugby union fullbacks
Aviron Bayonnais players
Racing 92 players
Sportspeople from Pyrénées-Atlantiques
French-Basque people
Living people
2001 births